David 'Davy' Glennon (born 5 February 1991) is an Irish hurler who currently plays for Westmeath having previously played for the Galway senior team. He continues to play with his club Mullagh.

He came on as a substitute in the 2012 All-Ireland Senior Hurling Championship Final against Kilkenny.
In 2016 he publicly admitted he had a serious gambling addiction, which had led to problems with the law, his family and hurling, and even to him contemplating ending his own life.

On 3 September 2017, Glennon was a non playing substitute for Galway as they won their first All-Ireland Senior Hurling Championship in 29 years against Waterford.

On 17 July 2021, Glennon helped Westmeath win the Joe McDonagh Cup for the first time at Croke Park after a 2-28 to 1-24 win over Kerry.

References

1991 births
Living people
Galway inter-county hurlers
Westmeath inter-county hurlers
Mullagh hurlers